WEC 30: McCullough vs. Crunkilton was a mixed martial arts (MMA) event held by World Extreme Cagefighting (WEC). The event took place on Wednesday, September 5, 2007 at the Hard Rock Hotel and Casino in Las Vegas, Nevada and aired live on the Versus Network.

The event featured a lightweight title match between champion "Razor" Rob McCullough and Richard Crunkilton.  Additionally, Chase Beebe defended his bantamweight title against Brazilian jiu-jitsu expert Rani Yahya, who replaced Manny Tapia on the card after Tapia suffered a knee injury. 

Former UFC Lightweight Champion Jens Pulver was scheduled to make his WEC & featherweight debut at this event against Cub Swanson, but was pulled from the card due to a knee injury. The matchup was rescheduled for WEC 31 three months later, where Pulver won by submission.

Sergio Gomez was originally slated to face WEC newcomer Donald Cerrone at this event, but was later pulled from the card and replaced by the debuting Kenneth Alexander.

Kevin Knabjian was expected to face Blas Avena at this event, but was later replaced by WEC newcomer Joe Benoit

Results

Reported Payout
The following is the reported payout to the fighters as reported to the Nevada State Athletic Commission. It does not include sponsor money or "locker room" bonuses often given by the WEC.

Rob McCullough: $24,000 (includes $12,000 win bonus) def. Richard Crunkilton: $10,000
Chase Beebe: $10,000 ($5,000 win bonus) def. Rani Yahya: $6,000
Brian Stann: $10,000 ($5,000 win bonus) def. Jeremiah Billington $2,000
Miguel Torres: $20,000 ($10,000 win bonus) def. Jeff Bedard $4,000
John Alessio: $22,000 ($11,000 win bonus) def. Marcelo Brito: $3,000
Marcus Hicks: $8,000 ($4,000 win bonus) def. Scott McAfee: $2,000
Bryan Baker: $6,000 ($3,000 win bonus) def. Jesse Forbes: $4,000
Donald Cerrone: $6,000 ($3,000 win bonus) def. Kenneth Alexander: $3,000
Blas Avena: $6,000 ($3,000 win bonus) def. Joe Benoit: $2,000
Ian McCall: $4,000 ($2,000 win bonus) def. Coty Wheeler: $2,000

See also 
 World Extreme Cagefighting
 List of WEC champions
 List of WEC events
 2007 in WEC

External links
Official WEC website

References

World Extreme Cagefighting events
2007 in mixed martial arts
Mixed martial arts in Las Vegas
2007 in sports in Nevada
Hard Rock Hotel and Casino (Las Vegas)